The 1994 Cronulla-Sutherland Sharks season was the 28th in the club's history. They competed in the NSWRL's 1994 Winfield Cup premiership.

Ladder

References

Cronulla-Sutherland Sharks seasons
Cronulla-Sutherland Sharks season